Siah Bid may refer to:
 Siah Bid-e Olya
 Siah Bid-e Sofla